Kentucky Route 218 (KY 218) is a 31.113-mile-long (50.072 km) west-east state highway that traverses three counties in south-central Kentucky. It is locally known as LeGrande Highway from Horse Cave to near Shady Grove.

Route description

Hart County
Kentucky Route 218 begins at the unincorporated Hart County community of Northtown west of Interstate 65 (I-65). It is the beginning of state maintenance as the main road west of Northtown is actually a locally-maintained road (Flint Ridge Road) that leads to the Mammoth Cave National Park, and would provide a direct link to the park's visitor center. The official Kentucky road maps do not show this section of KY 218 because of its western terminus is intersecting another back road and not a major road or highway.

It crosses I-65 at its Exit 58 interchange, and enters the town of Horse Cave, which is part of a tourism hotbed in southern Kentucky due to its proximity to the Mammoth Cave park. After running concurrently with Kentucky Route 335 for a couple of miles, it crosses U.S. Route 31W (Dixie Highway).
Five miles after downtown Horse Cave, it crosses U.S. Route 31E (Jackson Highway), and then continues eastward to LeGrande, and enters the northernmost section of Metcalfe County a moment after the KY 677 junction.

Metcalfe and Green Counties
KY 218 goes through a small sliver of the northernmost portion of Metcalfe County, and it intersects KY 314 while doing so. It enters Green County, crosses the Little Barren River, and reaches its end at Exie, where it meets the intersection with US 68 during that route's concurrency with Kentucky Route 70 from Sulphur Well all the way to Greensburg and Campbellsville.

History
KY 218 between US 31W and US 31E was formerly a portion of US 68 until that U.S. Highway was rerouted to its current alignment in the 1940s.

Points of interest along the route
Kentucky Down Under & Kentucky Caverns, Horse Cave
Hidden River Cave / American Cave Museum, downtown Horse Cave
Wigwam Roadside Store

Major intersections

Related road

Flint Ridge Road is an east–west local road that connects the Mammoth Cave National Park Visitor's Center directly to Horse Cave. It traverses eastern segments of Mammoth Cave National Park, which is in eastern Edmonson County, along with southwestern Hart County. It begins at an intersection with the Mammoth Cave Parkway near the park's Visitor's Center and ends at the I-65 exit 58 interchange with KY 218. The final  of the road is actually part of KY 218.

Points of interest along Flint Ridge Road include the Good Spring Baptist Church and Cemetery, and the Dennison Ferry Day-use area.

References

External links
KY 218 at Kentucky Roads

0218
0218
0218
0218